Vishal Dadlani (born 28 June 1973) is an Indian singer, songwriter, actor and music composer. He is one half of the duo Vishal–Shekhar, Front Man and vocalist of one of India's leading rock bands called Pentagram. 

As a singer he has sung various hit songs for various genre's notably Dhoom Again, Kurban Hua, Jee le Zara, Marjaiyann, I feel Good, Jab Mila Tu, Tu Meri, Swag Se Swagat, Bala, Har funn Maula, Khuda Hafiz. In an interview he admitted that he can sing from Rock to Romantic, any genre as he has particular voice texture for kind of genre. 
As a vocalist of band Pentagram, notable works are Voice, Tomorrow's Decided, Must I, Love Drug Climbdown and more to go. 
As music director, he has composed some Songs for Films such as Om Shanti Om, Anjana Anjani, Dostana, I Hate Luv Storys, Bang Bang, Sultan, Student of the Year, Befikre, War etc.

Dadlani has been in collaboration with many international artists like Imogen Heap, Diplo, The Vamps and Akon.

Early life
Dadlani was born and raised in a Sindhi Hindu family in Bandra, West Bombay. He went to Hill Grange High School in Pedder Road, Cumbala Hill, South Bombay and subsequently attended Jai Hind College, University of Mumbai for two years (1989–90), after which he went to H.R. College of Commerce and Economics, HSNC University, both in Churchgate, South Bombay. He graduated in 1994 with a bachelor's degree in commerce.

Career
Dadlani's musical journey started in 1994 with the Mumbai-based electronica/indie-rock band Pentagram, which he fronted. Pentagram has gained recognition as one of the pioneers of Indian independent music.

While active with the band, Dadlani found fame as a Bollywood music composer, singer, and lyricist, with movies like Jhankaar Beats, Bluff Master, and Salaam Namaste.

Collaboration with Shekhar

In 1999, Vishal–Shekhar, the Bollywood composing/producing and performing music duo, was formed. Dadlani and Shekhar Ravjiani have worked together on Hindi, Telugu, Tamil, and Marathi films. Their notable works include Jhankaar Beats (2003), Dus (2005), Bluffmaster (2005), I See You (2006), Om Shanti Om (2007), Bachna Ae Haseeno (2008), Dostana (2008),  Anjaana Anjaani (2010), Ra.One (2011), Student of the Year (2012), Chennai Express (2013), Bang Bang! (2014), Happy New Year (2014), Sultan (2016), and Befikre (2016). The duo has gained nationwide recognition, and today are credited with being amongst the architects of the modern Bollywood sound, having composed music for over 60 films, released over 300 songs, and performed over 1,000 shows worldwide. The two rose to prominence in 2003 when they wrote the score for the film Jhankaar Beats, which included the song "Tu Aashiqui Hai". They won the Filmfare RD Burman Award for New Music Talent for their work on the film.

Controversies
 In the aftermath of the Panama Paper leaks, the names of Dadlani and some of his family members surfaced due to investments they made through his company Sunny Blessing Holding Inc. in the British Virgin Islands. Some of these transactions are currently under investigation by the enforcement directorate.
 In 2016, Dadlani received strong opposition for criticizing the Jain monk Muni Tarun Sagar ji in a tweet. He was accused of hurting religious sentiments and several First information reports were filed against him, though the monk is said to not have taken the issue seriously. Dadlani later wrote an open letter, saying that the tweets had been his biggest mistake. He was fined by the Punjab and Haryana High Court for the tweet.

Playback singer
Dadlani got his first break as a playback singer when Shankar–Ehsaan–Loy asked him to sing "Kiss Of Love" for the movie Jhoom Barabar Jhoom. But because of some reasons the track delayed and he had recorded a track called "Dhoom Again" for Pritam as asked by Aditya Chopra which came out before "Kiss of Love".

Partial list of films Dadlani has recorded vocals for:

  ShyamSinghaRoy (2021)
  DNA mein Dance (2020)
  Kareeb (2021)
  Har Funn Maula (2021)
  Khuda Hafiz (Titletrack)(2020)
  Solo Brathuke So Better (2020)
  Khaali Peeli (2020)
  Bunty Aur Babli 2 (2020)
  Angrezi Medium (2020)
  Baaghi 3 (2020)
  Lage Raho Kejriwal (2020)
 Housefull 4 (2019)
  Made in China (2019)
  Saand Ki Aankh (2019)
 War (2019)
  Four Weddings and a Funeral (2019)
 Student of the Year 2 (2019)
  Malal (2019)
 Thugs of Hindostan (2018)
 Open Tuborg (with Diplo) (2018)
 Namaste England (2018)
 Bogda (2018)
 Mulk (2018)
 Chacha Vidhayak Hain Humare (2018)
 Naa Peru Surya, Naa Illu India (2018)
 Gold (2018)
 Kaalakaandi (2018)
 One (2017)
 Tiger Zinda Hai (2017)
 Chef (2017)
 A Gentleman (2017)
 Befikre (2016)
 Banjo (2016)
 Sultan (2016)
 Sarrainodu (2016)
 Miruthan (2016)
 ABCD 2 (2015)
 Bajirao Mastani (2015)
 Vedalam (2015)
 Romeo Juliet (2015)
 Kaaki Sattai (2015)
 Ungli (2014)
 Bang Bang! (2014)
 Happy New Year (2014)
 Hasee Toh Phasee (2014)
 Kaththi (2014)
 Vanakkam Chennai (2013)
 Chennai Express (2013)
 Gippi (2013)
 Yeh Jawaani Hai Deewani (2013)
 Akaash Vani (2013)
 Race 2 (2013)
 Student of the Year (2012)
 Talaash (2012)
 Kyaa Super Kool Hain Hum (2012)
 Shanghai (2012)
 Vicky Donor (2012)
 Ishaqzaade (2012)
 Ek Main Aur Ekk Tu (2012)
 Don 2 (2011)
 Ladies vs Ricky Bahl (2011)
 Ra.One (2011)
 Mujhse Fraaandship Karoge (2011)
 Zindagi Na Milegi Dobara (2011)
 Bbuddah... Hoga Terra Baap (2011)
 Pyar Ka Punchnama (2011)
 Game (2011)
 Patiala House (2011)
 No One Killed Jessica (2011)
 Tees Maar Khan (2010)
 Break Ke Baad (2010)
 Knock Out (2010)
 Anjaana Anjaani (2010)
 We Are Family (2010)
 I Hate Luv Storys (2010)
 Kites (2010)
 Paathshaala (2010)
 Hum Tum Aur Ghost (2010)
 Pyaar Impossible (2010)
 Rocket Singh: Salesman of the Year (2009)
 Kurbaan (2009)
 Aladin (2009)
 London Dreams (2009)
 Kaminey (2009)
 8 x 10 Tasveer (2009)
 Dostana (2008)
 Bachna Ae Haseeno (2008)
 Krazzy 4 (2008)
 Tashan (2008)
 Taare Zameen Par (2007)
 Cash (2007)
 Ta Ra Rum Pum (2007)
 Honeymoon Travels Pvt. Ltd. (2007)
 I See You (2006)
 Dhoom 2 (2006)
 Golmaal (2006)
 Taxi Number 9211 (2006)
 Bluffmaster (2005)
 Ek Ajnabee (2005)
 Karam (2005)
 Shabd (2005)
 Popcorn Khao! Mast Ho Jao (2004)
 Jhankaar Beats (2003)

Lyrics by Vishal Dadlani

 Pyaar Mein Kabhi Kabhi – "Musu Musu Hasi", "Woh Naujawan Hai", "Lakhon Deewane", "Pehli Baar" Along with Raj Kaushal (1993)
 Waisa Bhi Hota Hai Part II - "Allah ke Bande" (2003) 
 Jhankaar Beats – All songs (2003)
 Popcorn Khao! Mast Ho Jao – All songs (2004)
 Karam – "Tinka Tinka" (2005)
 Bluffmaster! – (2005)
 I See You - All songs (2006)
 Golmaal – Aage Peeche (2006)
 Cash – All songs except for "Reham Kare" (2007)
 Om Shanti Om - "Ajab Si" (2007)
 Dostana – "Kuch Kum" (2008)
 Aladin – All songs except for "Bachke O Bachke" (2009)
 I Hate Luv Storys – "Bin Tere", "Bin Tere (Reprise)", "Jab Mila Tu" (2010)
 Anjaana Anjaani – "Hairat,"I Feel Good", "Tujhe Bhula Diya" (Along with Kumar), "Aas Pas Khuda" & "Aas Pas Khuda (Reprise)" (Along with Shekhar) (2010)
 Tees Maar Khan – "Sheila Ki Jawani" (2010)
 Ra.One - "Chamak Chalo" (Along with Shekhar and Niranjan Iyengar), "Raftarein" (2011) 
 Kahaani – "Ami Shotti Bolchi," Kahaani (Male), Kahaani (Female) (2012)
 Shanghai –  (2012)
 Gippi – Along with Anvita Dutt (2013)
 Bang Bang! – Tu Meri", "Bang Bang" (2014)
 Banjo – "Banjo Party"  Along with Ravi Jadhav (2016)
 Sultan  – "Tuk Tuk Rap"  (2016)
 Tiger Zinda Hai – "Swag Se Swagat Rap"(2017)
 War – "Khalid's theme English Rap" (2019)
 Bob Biswas - "Tu Toh Gaya Re" (2021)
 Jayeshbhai Jordaar - "Firecracker (English)" along with Vayu and Kumaar (2022)
 Pathaan - "Besharam Rang" along with Kumaar (2023)

Discography

Pentagram
 We're Not Listening (1996)
 Up (2002)
 It's OK, It's All Good (2007)
 Bloodywood'' (2011)

Filmography
 Om Shanti Om (2007) as a director 
 Tees Maar Khan (2010) as a director in the song "Sheila Ki Jawani"
 Happy New Year (2014) as a Judge

Awards and nominations
The following is a list of awards and nominations received by Vishal Dadlani alone. A list of awards and nominations received by Vishal—Shekhar can be seen here.

Apsara Film and Television Producers Guild Award

BIG Star Entertainment Awards

Filmfare Awards

Global Indian Music Academy Awards

International Indian Film Academy Awards

Mirchi Music Awards

References

External links
 
 Vishal Dadlani on Twitter
 Vishal Dadlani on Ganna.com
 Vishal Dadlani on Spotify.com

Indian film score composers
Bollywood playback singers
Indian male playback singers
Living people
1973 births
Sindhi people
Indian folk-pop singers
Indian male pop singers
Indian rock singers
Tamil playback singers
Telugu playback singers
Kannada playback singers
Bengali playback singers
Marathi playback singers
20th-century Indian singers
21st-century Indian singers
Singers from Mumbai
21st-century Indian composers
Indian male film score composers
20th-century Indian male singers
21st-century Indian male singers
Hill Grange High School alumni
Jai Hind College alumni